Françoise Massardier-Kenney  is a translator and translation scholar.

She is the Director of the Institute for Applied Linguistics and Professor of Modern and Classical Language Studies at Kent State University. Her scholarly work includes serving as the general editor of the American Translators Association Scholarly Monograph Series and co-editor in chief of George Sand Studies.

She has translated Antoine Berman's Pour une critique des traductions: John Donne into English with the title Toward a Translation Criticism: John Donne. This work is influential in the field of translation criticism.

References

External links
Françoise Massardier-Kenney at Traductomania

Kent State University alumni
American translators
Kent State University faculty
American translation scholars
French–English translators
1954 births
Living people
American women writers
American women academics
21st-century American women
Linguists from the United States